Mbeya Rural District is one of the seven districts of Mbeya Region, Tanzania.  It is bordered to the north by Mbarali District and Chunya District, to the south by Mbeya Urban District and Rungwe District, to the east by Iringa Region and to the west by Mbozi District.

In 2016 the Tanzania National Bureau of Statistics report there were 336,498 people in the district, from 305,319 in 2012.

Administrative subdivisions

Constituencies
For parliamentary elections, Tanzania is divided into constituencies. As of the 2010 elections Mbeya Rural District had one constituency:
 Mbeya Vijijini Constituency

Divisions

Wards
Mbeya Rural District is administratively divided into twenty-eight wards:

 Bonde la Usongwe
 Igale
 Ihango
 Ijombe
 Ikukwa
 Ilembo
 Ilungu
 Inyala
 Isuto
 Iwiji
 Iwindi
 Iyunga Mapinduzi
 Mshewe
 Santilya
 Tembela
 Ulenje
 Utengule Usongwe
 Mjele
 Shizuvi
 Izyira
 Nsalala
 Maendeleo
 Lwanjiro
 Swaya
 Itawa
 Igoma
 Itewe
 Masoko

Notes

Districts of Mbeya Region